Statistics of Bahraini Premier League for the 1986–87 season.

Overview
Bahrain Riffa Club won the championship.

References
RSSSF

Bahraini Premier League seasons
Bah
1986–87 in Bahraini football